David Halliday (March 3, 1916 – April 2, 2010) was an American physicist known for his physics textbooks, Physics and Fundamentals of Physics, which he wrote with Robert Resnick. Both textbooks have been in continuous use since 1960 and are available in more than 47 languages.

Halliday attended the University of Pittsburgh both as an undergraduate student and a graduate student, receiving his Ph.D. in physics in 1941. During World War II, he worked at the MIT Radiation Lab developing radar techniques. In 1946 he returned to Pittsburgh as an assistant professor and spent the rest of his career there. In 1950, he wrote Introductory Nuclear Physics, which became a classic text and was translated into four languages. In 1951 Halliday became the Department Chair, a position he held until 1962.

His Physics has been used widely and is considered by many to have revolutionized physics education. Now in its tenth edition in a two-volume set revised by Jearl Walker, and under the title Fundamentals of Physics, it is still highly regarded. It is noted for its clear standardized diagrams, very thorough but highly readable pedagogy, outlook into modern physics, and challenging, thought provoking problems. In 2002 the American Physical Society named the work the most outstanding introductory physics text of the 20th century.

Halliday died at the age of 94 on April 2, 2010. He was living in Maple Falls, Washington. His doctoral students include John Wheatley.

References

 University of Pittsburgh biography

American physicists
American textbook writers
American male non-fiction writers
University of Pittsburgh alumni
University of Pittsburgh faculty
1916 births
2010 deaths
Manhattan Project people